The 2016–17 PGA Tour was the 102nd season of the PGA Tour, and the 50th since separating from the PGA of America. The season began on October 13, 2016.

Schedule 
The following table lists official events during the 2016–17 season.

Unofficial events
The following events were sanctioned by the PGA Tour, but did not carry FedEx Cup points or official money, nor were wins official.

Location of tournaments

Money leaders
The money list was based on prize money won during the season, calculated in U.S. dollars.

Awards

See also
2016 in golf
2017 in golf
2017 Web.com Tour
2017 PGA Tour Champions season
2017 European Tour

Notes

References

External links
Official site

PGA Tour seasons
PGA Tour
PGA Tour